Deshnoke railway station is a railway station in Bikaner district, Rajasthan. Its code is DSO. It serves Deshnoke town. The station consists of 2 platforms. Passenger, Express and Superfast trains halt here.

References

Railway stations in Bikaner district
Jodhpur railway division